Canada Building may refer to:

in Canada
Canada Building (Saskatoon), historic property, located in Saskatoon, Saskatchewan
Canada Building (Windsor), in Windsor, Ontario (former tallest building in Canada)